UNIT is a science fiction audio series produced by Big Finish Productions focused on the fictional military organisation of the same name, who investigate extra terrestrial threat. Members of UNIT include Kate Stewart, Sam Bishop and Josh Carter

Cast

Notable guests

Katy Manning as Jo Grant
John Levene as John Benton
Richard Franklin as Mike Yates
Pik-Sen Lim as Chin Lee
Alex Kingston as River Song
Tom Baker as The Curator

The Original Series

Series 1 (2004–05)

Special (2012)

Brave New World (2022)

The New Series 

UNIT was relaunched in 2015 as UNIT: The New Series. Each series is principally led by Jemma Redgrave and Ingrid Oliver reprising their roles of Kate Stewart and Petronella Osgood from the relaunched series of Doctor Who.

Series 1: Extinction (2015)

Series 2: Shutdown (2016)

Series 3: Silenced (2016)

Series 4: Assembled (2017)

Series 5: Encounters (2017)

Series 6: Cyber-Reality (2018)

Series 7: Revisitations (2018)

Series 8: Incursions (2019)

Nemesis 1: Between Two Worlds (2021)

Nemesis 2: Agents of the Vulpreen (2022)

Nemesis 3: Objective – Earth (2022)

Nemesis 4: Masters of Time

References

Audio plays based on Doctor Who
Big Finish Productions
Doctor Who spin-offs